Ethnic electronica (also known as ethnotronica, ethno electronica or ethno techno) is a broad category of electronic music, where artists combine elements of electronic and world music. The music is primarily rooted in local music traditions and regional cultures, rarely relying on global trends of popular music.

History

1980s

In the West Balkans, a Southern European subgenre of contemporary pop music known as "turbo-folk" (sometimes referred to as "popular folk") initially developed during the 1980s and 1990s, with similar music styles in Greece (Skyladiko), Bulgaria (Chalga), Romania (Manele) and Albania (Tallava). It's a fusion genre of popular music blending Serbian folk music with other genres such as pop, rock, electronic, and/or hip-hop.

Other notable examples of 1980s ethnic electronica include Angolan kuduro, Mexican tecnocumbia and the Indian album Synthesizing: Ten Ragas to a Disco Beat.

1990s

With the advent of electronic music technology and availability of traditional instruments, fusion forms of the two eventually arose. Such genres use electronic musical instruments and/or traditional folk arrangements, acoustic instruments, and the like, to create distinct styles. For example, they may use acoustic instruments―stringed instruments―while incorporating hip hop, or four-on-the-floor rhythms, although it varies based on influences and choice of sounds. The Ashgate Research Companion to Popular Musicology introduces "folktronica," as "a catch-all [term] for all manner of artists who have combined mechanical dance beats with elements of acoustic rock or folk."

The 1993 album Every Man and Woman is a Star by Ultramarine is credited as a progenitor of modern electronic folk music; it featured a pastoral sound and incorporated traditional instruments such as violin and harmonica with house and techno elements. According to The Sunday Times Culture's Encyclopedia of Modern Music, essential albums of the genre are Four Tet's Pause (2001), Tunng's Mother's Daughter and Other Songs (2005), and Caribou's The Milk of Human Kindness (2005).

2010s
In the 2010s, new artists such as alt-J and Bon Iver achieved considerable commercial success in what had been a fairly underground scene since its inception. Bon Iver's latest works, 22, A Million (2016) and i,i (2019), entered the top ten in several countries and produced equally successful singles and Grammy nominations.

In the late 2010s, the Ukrainian ethnotronica scene had a rise, when such artists as Go_A, Onuka, Yuko, Mavka became popular outside of their country.

Notable artists
Notable acts of ethnic electronica include Bryn Jones with his project Muslimgauze, the artists of Asian underground movement (Cheb i Sabbah, Asian Dub Foundation, Joi, State of Bengal, Transglobal Underground, Natacha Atlas), Mozani Ramzan, Shpongle, Ott, Zavoloka, Linda George, Banco de Gaia, AeTopus, Zingaia, Afro-Celt Sound System, Métisse, The Halluci Nation, early work by Yat-Kha (with Ivan Sokolovsky).

References

Electronic music genres
World music genres
British styles of music